This is a list of bridges, ferries, and other crossings of the Gulf of St. Lawrence, Saint Lawrence River, and Great Lakes, by order of south shore terminal running from the Gulf of Saint Lawrence upstream to Lake Superior.

Crossings

Quebec

Lower and Middle Saint Lawrence

Island of Montreal

Upper Saint Lawrence and Beauharnois Canal

Ontario and the United States

Upper Saint Lawrence River

Lake Ontario and Niagara River

Lake Erie / Bass Islands

Detroit and St. Clair Rivers

Straits of Mackinac and Soo Locks area

Lake Huron / Georgian Bay, Ontario

Lake Superior

Lake Michigan

See also

 List of crossings of the Rivière des Mille Îles
 List of crossings of the Rivière des Prairies
 List of bridges to the Island of Montreal
 List of crossings of the Ottawa River

Notes
The year of construction of the original structure. In the case of ferries, no date is given, as the beginning of a ferry link is often not documented.

Provides only a partial crossing.

Nordik Express offers, in addition to links to Rimouski, Sept-Îles, and Havre-Saint-Pierre, a ferry link to several communities along the Basse-Côte-Nord. Its easternmost terminal is in Blanc-Sablon, Quebec.

Quebec Bridge is the lowermost fixed crossing of the whole river.

The Louis-Hippolyte Lafontaine complex consists of a tunnel from Montreal to Île Charron and a bridge from Île Charron to the South Shore.

Jacques-Cartier Bridge was originally named Harbour Bridge/Pont du Havre, and renamed after Jacques Cartier in 1934 (400th anniversary of Cartier's first voyage). The section over the St. Lawrence Seaway was lifted to a new height in 1962.

Pont de la Concorde (Concorde Bridge) and Pont des Îles ("Bridge of the Islands") were built for Expo 67. Pont de la Concorde connects Montreal Island to Saint Helen's Island, while Pont des Îles connects Saint Helen's Island to Notre-Dame Island.

Victoria Bridge was built as a one-track tubular bridge which opened in 1860, then rebuilt as a two-track truss bridge in 1898. The South Y approach was rebuilt around the Saint-Lambert locks of the St. Lawrence Seaway in 1961.

At the north end of Champlain Bridge, two spans, one north-south (aut. 15 and 20) and one east-west (aut. 10) connect Île des Sœurs to I. of Montreal. These two spans, called Pont Île-des-Sœurs and Pont Clément, are part of the Champlain Bridge complex.

The Champlain Bridge Ice Structure, known in French as "l'Estacade Champlain," was built to control ice floes coming from the Laprairie Basin.

The section of Honoré-Mercier bridge spanning over the St. Lawrence Seaway was rebuilt to seaway standards in the 1950s. The bridge was twinned by an identical one, on the downriver side, which opened in 1963.

The Edgar Hébert Boulevard crossing consists of a suspension bridge over the discharge of the Beauharnois Power Station and a tunnel under the locks of Beauharnois Canal.

The South Channel Bridge was demolished in 1958, and the North Channel Bridge in 1965.

The Burlington Bay Skyway does not cross between both sides of the St. Lawrence/Great Lakes river system, but it is a major thoroughfare crossing the western tip of Lake Ontario, which allows motorists to drive around the city of Hamilton.

References

External links
 Ontario Government Ferry Information Howe and Wolfe Islands
 Quebec Government Ferries webpage
 Wolfe, Horne, and Simcoe Island Ferry Information

Saint Lawrence River
Saint Lawrence River
Saint Lawrence River
Saint Lawrence River
Saint Lawrence River
Saint Lawrence River
Saint Lawrence River
Saint Lawrence River
Crossings